Christof Putzel is an American journalist and correspondent for Travel Channel. He is a former correspondent for Al Jazeera America's news magazine America Tonight and Current TV's investigative documentary series, Vanguard.

Career
Christof began his production career while an undergraduate at Connecticut College, where he produced his first documentary, "Left Behind," about AIDS orphans in Kenya. The film won over a dozen awards at film festivals, including a Student Academy Award, the International Documentary Association’s David Wolper Award, and HBO Films Best Student Film Award.

Christof joined Current TV in 2005 as one of the network’s first employees. The following year, he was nominated for his first Emmy for his report from Mogadishu, Somalia about the rise and fall of the Islamic Court Union. He trekked in the jungles of the Democratic Republic of Congo to cover the exploitation of child gold miners, made the treacherous journey through the desert to cross the Mexico/US border with migrants trying to reach American soil, and camped on the southern shores of Yemen, where he discovered the bodies of more than two-dozen refugees who drowned attempting to escape the violence in Somalia.

His documentary, “From Russia with Hate,” about the rise of violent attacks against immigrants in Moscow by neo-Nazi skinheads, won Columbia University’s Alfred I. DuPont Award and the prestigious Livingston Award for International Reporting. He was nominated for his third Emmy for “Lost in Democracy,” a documentary about the first democratic elections held in the tiny Himalayan Kingdom of Bhutan.

In 2012, "Sex, Lies, and Cigarettes," a documentary centered around Aldi, "the Indonesian smoking baby," went viral after exposing Philip Morris's marketing practices in the developing world. It won an Overseas Press Club Award, a PRISM Award, and was nominated for an Emmy.

In 2013, Christof was awarded his second Alfred I. duPont–Columbia University Award for "Arming the Mexican Cartels," a documentary investigating gun trafficking into Mexico from the United States.

When Current TV was sold to Al Jazeera Media in 2013, Putzel became a senior correspondent for the network's flagship news magazine, America Tonight.

Personal life
Putzel is a third-generation news reporter. His father, Michael Putzel, covered the Vietnam War and the White House for the Associated Press. His mother, Ann Blackman, was a correspondent for Time and a reporter for the Associated Press. His grandfather, Samuel G. Blackman, was a top editor for the Associated Press.

Christof was married to Julia Taft, a great-granddaughter of late Robert A. Taft, Republican senator from Ohio, and a great-great-granddaughter of President and Chief Justice William Howard Taft. They divorced in 2014.

Awards

See also
 Adam Yamaguchi
 Al Jazeera America
 Current TV
 Mariana van Zeller
 Vanguard

References

1979 births
Living people
American television reporters and correspondents
Al Jazeera people
Connecticut College alumni
American male journalists
People from Washington, D.C.
Livingston Award winners for International Reporting